Naina is a Hindi horror film released in India in 2005. It stars Urmila Matondkar. The film was premiered in the Marché du Film section of the 2005 Cannes Film Festival. The film is a remake of the 2002 Hong Kong-Singaporean horror film The Eye directed by the Pang brothers.

Its release caused controversy in India because its depiction of the protagonist seeing ghosts after receiving a corneal transplant was similar to existing fears in India surrounding corneal transplants and it was feared the film would discourage people from donating corneas or seeking corneal transplants.

Plot
During a solar eclipse in 1986, young Naina Shah, while traveling in the backseat of her England-based dad's car, is struck by glass from the shattered windshield during an accident, and loses her eyesight. Her parents do not survive, and she is brought up by her paternal grandmother. Years later, Naina gets a successful corneal transplant, and is able to see. She complains of vision problems, seeing hooded persons, and people dying, which a psychiatrist, Samir Patel, diagnoses as hallucinations. But when Naina reports seeing someone else in her mirror reflection, Sameer decides to investigate who the original cornea actually belonged to. This investigation will lead them to an impoverished village in New Bhuj, Gujarat, where she will find her life endangered by hostile villagers who believe that the donor of her cornea was cursed.

Naina learns the story of her donor, Khemi. Khemi was born with the ability to see a person's imminent death, and was ostracised by the society. One night, she tried to save the village from a great fire, but nobody believed her. After the fire broke out, those same villagers blamed Khemi for the disaster. Khemi committed suicide out of despair. Naina returns to England, where she unsuccessfully tries to save people from a fire. In the accident, Naina once again loses her eyesight, but she does not regret it because she has the love of Samir and her grandmother.

Cast 
 Urmila Matondkar as Dr. Naina Shah
 Anuj Sawhney as Dr. Samir Patel
 Malavika as Khemi
 Amardeep Jha as Somabai
 Kamini Khanna as Mrs. Shah
 Sulabha Arya as Parvati Amma
 Morne Botes as Burn Victim
 Dinesh Lamba as Rathore
 Rahul Nath as Ghost blood rain car
 Anthony Rosato as Police Officer
 Tom Saville as Misc
 Pankaj Upadhyay as Victim

Reception
Naina received mostly positive reviews from the critics. Taran Adarsh from Bollywood Hungama said, "NAINA is one of the most imaginative and pulse-pounding horror films to come along in recent times. It leaves the viewer frightened, terrified and petrified. As a horror movie, it packs one genuine scare after another, right till its finale". Urmila Matondkar was especially praised for her performance.

Box office
The film got a 50% opening in the first week, but its collections increased heavily. At last it was given a 'hit' tag.

References

External links 
 

2000s Hindi-language films
Indian supernatural horror films
2005 films
Indian remakes of Hong Kong films
2005 horror films
Films shot in London
Films shot in India
Films about blind people in India
Films scored by Salim–Sulaiman
Indian ghost films
Indian horror film remakes